The 2014 Friends Life Tour of Britain was an eight-stage men's professional road cycling race. It was the eleventh running of the 2004 incarnation of the Tour of Britain and the 75th British tour in total. The race started on 7 September in Liverpool, finishing on 14 September in London. The race was part of the 2014 UCI Europe Tour, and was categorised by the UCI as a 2.HC race, for the first time.

Teams

The twenty teams invited to participate in the Tour of Britain were:

Stages

There were 8 stages in the 2014 race. Notable stages were Stage 3, which featured a summit finish, and Stage 5, a hilly stage to Exeter.

Stage 1
7 September 2014 — Liverpool to Liverpool,

Stage 2
8 September 2014 — Knowsley to Llandudno,

Stage 3
9 September 2014 — Newtown to The Tumble,

Stage 4
10 September 2014 — Worcester to Bristol,

Stage 5
11 September 2014 — Exmouth to Exeter,

Stage 6
12 September 2014 — Bath to Hemel Hempstead,

Stage 7
13 September 2014 — Camberley to Brighton,

Stage 8a
14 September 2014 — London to London,

Stage 8b
14 September 2014 — London to London,

Classification leadership

Standings

General classification

Points classification

Mountains classification

Sprints classification

Team classification

References

External links

2014
Tour of Britain
Tour of Britain